Portersville is an unincorporated community in Boone Township, Dubois County, in the U.S. state of Indiana.

History
Portersville was established as a town circa 1818. It is reportedly the oldest town in Dubois County, and was selected as the county seat of Dubois County before it was changed to Jasper. A post office was established at Portersville in 1821, and remained in operation until it was discontinued in 1909.

Geography

References

Unincorporated communities in Dubois County, Indiana
Unincorporated communities in Indiana
Jasper, Indiana micropolitan area
1810s establishments in Indiana
Populated places established in the 1810s
Former county seats in Indiana